The Voice of Poland (season 12) began airing on September 11, 2021, on TVP 2. It is airing on Saturdays at 20:00. Tomson & Baron returned as coaches for their tenth season. Also Justyna Steczkowska and Marek Piekarczyk returned to the show after a seven-year break for their fourth and fifth season, respectively. Sylwia Grzeszczak joined the jury panel of the twelfth season of The Voice of Poland as a new female coach.

Marta Burdynowicz won the season, marking Justyna Steczkowska's second win as a coach.

Coaches and hosts
On August 6, 2021, it was announced that Justyna Steczkowska, Tomson & Baron, Sylwia Grzeszczak and Marek Piekarczyk would become the coaches for the twelfth season of the show.
On August 11, 2021, Tomasz Kammel and Małgorzata Tomaszewska confirmed that they would return as the hosts for their eleventh and second season, respectively.

 On August 20, 2021, it was announced that Aleksander Sikora would join Tomasz Kammel and Małgorzata Tomaszewska as the third host. 
 On September 11, 2021, it was announced that season 8 finalist Michał Szczygieł would serve as the fourth and last host for the twelfth season of the show.

Teams

Blind auditions
The blind auditions began on September 11, 2021. Each coach has two "blocks" to prevent another coach from getting an artist with only 2 blocks permitted to be used per blind audition. Each coach ends up with 12 artists by the end of the blind auditions, creating a total of 48 artists advancing to the battles.

 Marek pressed Justyna's button.

Battles round 
The battles began airing on October 16, 2021. In this round, the coaches pick two of their artists in a singing match and then select one of them to advance to the next round. Losing artists may be "stolen" by another coach, becoming new members of their team. Multiple coaches can attempt to steal an artist, resulting in a competition for the artist, who will ultimately decide which team they will go to. At the end of this round, seven artists will remain on each team; six will be battle winners, and one from a steal. In total, 28 artists advance to the knockouts.

 Due to health conditions Adela Konop was forced to withdraw. As a result Wiktoria Bińczyk sang with her coach, Marek Piekarczyk.

Knockouts round 
The Knockout round will premiere on November 6, 2021. During this stage, all contestants have to sing - the first four from each team are automatically put in the hot seats, and after subsequent performances of the remaining three, the coach decides whether a given contestant stays in the show or not. In the end, four contestants from each team qualify for the live episodes.

Live shows 
The Live shows began on November 13, 2021. When the teams consist of four contestants, the coach chooses from among the two contestants with the fewest votes from the viewers (who decide by sending text messages) the person who drops out of the program. Each live episode ends with the elimination of one person from each group. In the semi-final (when the team is made up of two people), each coach divides 100 points to their artists in any way they want. The same happens with the viewers' votes, and the artist with the most points added passes through to the Final.

Week 1: Live round (November 13)

Week 2: Quarter-final (November 20)

Week 3: Semi-final (November 27)

Week 4: Final (December 4)

Results summary of live shows

Color key 
Artist's info

  Artist from Team Tomson & Baron
  Artist from Team Sylwia
  Artist from Team Justyna
  Artist from Team Marek

Result details

  Winner
  Runner-up
  Third place
  Fourth place
  Advanced to the finale with the most points
  Saved by his/her coach
  Saved by the public
  Eliminated

Overall

Per team

References

The Voice of Poland
2021 Polish television seasons